The 1981 European Weightlifting Championships were held in Lille, France, from September 13 to September 20, 1981. This was the 60th edition of the event. There were 149 men in action from 25 nations. This tournament was a part of 1981 World Weightlifting Championships.

Medal summary

Medal table
Ranking by Big (Total result) medals

References
Results (Chidlovski.net)
М. Л. Аптекарь. «Тяжёлая атлетика. Справочник.» — М.: «Физкультура и спорт», 1983. — 416 с. 

European Weightlifting Championships
European Weightlifting Championships
European Weightlifting Championships
International weightlifting competitions hosted by France
Sport in Lille
September 1981 sports events in Europe